Bogacki (feminine: Bogacka, plural: Bogaccy) is a surname of Polish origin. Due to its pronunciation ('c' is pronounced 'ts' in Polish), it is sometimes respelled as Bogatski or Bogatzki. People with the surname include:

 Henry Bogacki (1912–2007), American football player
 Przemysław Bogacki, Polish mathematician
 Sylwia Bogacka (born 1981), Polish sports shooter
 Dieter Bogatzki (1942–2000), German middle-distance runner

See also
 
 Bogacki–Shampine method

Polish-language surnames